We'd Rather Be Flying was a band on the Lumberjack/Saddle Creek record label. Members included Shane Aspegren, A.J. Mogis, and Mike Mogis. They released the album The Solution for Your Thinning Hair in 1995. The trio then joined musician Ted Stevens in Lullaby for the Working Class. Recently, Shane Aspegren contributed to the album Cassadaga by Saddle Creek outfit Bright Eyes, which also features Mike Mogis as a full-time member.

External links
Saddle Creek Records

American indie rock groups